Barnes v. Train (1974) is commonly viewed as the first sexual harassment case in America, even though the term "sexual harassment" was not used. The case involved Paulette Barnes, a payroll clerk who worked for the Environmental Protection Agency. Barnes brought the case after losing her job for refusing the advances of a male supervisor. The case was initially dismissed, but won on appeal in Barnes v. Costle (1977). During Barnes v Costle, the United States Court of Appeals for the District of Columbia Circuit reversed the original findings and ruled it was sex discrimination for a woman to suffer tangible employment losses (for example losing her job) for refusing to submit to requests for sexual favors. The appeals ruling was based in part on the Williams v. Saxbe (1976) decision by a U.S. District Court which ruled that quid pro quo sexual harassment constitutes sex discrimination under the Civil Rights Act of 1964. Barnes also found that companies are liable for not stopping sexual harassment if they know it is being conducted by supervisors. As a result of Barnes v. Costle, Barnes received about $18,000 for back pay and the loss of promotions.

References 

Business ethics cases
History of labor relations in the United States
Sexism
Sexual harassment in the United States
United States employment discrimination case law
Harassment case law
1974 in United States case law
United States labor case law
United States gender discrimination case law
1974 in women's history
History of women in the United States